In mathematics, specifically the theory of quadratic forms, an ε-quadratic form is a generalization of quadratic forms to skew-symmetric settings and to *-rings; , accordingly for symmetric or skew-symmetric. They are also called -quadratic forms, particularly in the context of surgery theory.

There is the related notion of ε-symmetric forms, which generalizes symmetric forms, skew-symmetric forms (= symplectic forms), Hermitian forms, and skew-Hermitian forms. More briefly, one may refer to quadratic, skew-quadratic, symmetric, and skew-symmetric forms, where "skew" means (−) and the * (involution) is implied.

The theory is 2-local: away from 2, ε-quadratic forms are equivalent to ε-symmetric forms: half the symmetrization map (below) gives an explicit isomorphism.

Definition
ε-symmetric forms and ε-quadratic forms are defined as follows.

Given a module M over a *-ring R, let B(M) be the space of bilinear forms on M, and let  be the "conjugate transpose" involution . Since multiplication by −1 is also an involution and commutes with linear maps, −T is also an involution. Thus we can write  and εT is an involution, either T or −T (ε can be more general than ±1; see below). Define the ε-symmetric forms as the invariants of εT, and the ε-quadratic forms are the coinvariants.

As an exact sequence,

As kernel and cokernel,

The notation Qε(M), Qε(M) follows the standard notation MG, MG for the invariants and coinvariants for a group action, here of the order 2 group (an involution).

Composition of the inclusion and quotient maps (but not ) as  yields a map Qε(M) → Qε(M): every ε-symmetric form determines an ε-quadratic form.

Symmetrization
This is a symmetric form because , so it is in the kernel. More precisely, . Thus every ε-quadratic form determines an ε-symmetric form.

Composing these two maps either way:  or  yields multiplication by 2, and thus these maps are bijective if 2 is invertible in R, with the inverse given by multiplication with 1/2.

An ε-quadratic form  is called non-degenerate if the associated ε-symmetric form  is non-degenerate.

Generalization from *
If the * is trivial, then , and "away from 2" means that 2 is invertible: .

More generally, one can take for  any element such that .  always satisfy this, but so does any element of norm 1, such as complex numbers of unit norm.

Similarly, in the presence of a non-trivial *, ε-symmetric forms are equivalent to ε-quadratic forms if there is an element  such that .

For instance, in the ring  (the integral lattice for the quadratic form ), with complex conjugation,  are two such elements, though .

Intuition

In terms of matrices (we take V to be 2-dimensional), if * is trivial:
 matrices  correspond to bilinear forms
 the subspace of symmetric matrices  correspond to symmetric forms
 the subspace of (−1)-symmetric matrices  correspond to symplectic forms
 the bilinear form  yields the quadratic form
,
 the map 1 + T from quadratic forms to symmetric forms maps 
Mapping back to quadratic forms yields double the original: .

If  is complex conjugation, then
 the subspace of symmetric matrices are the Hermitian matrices 
 the subspace of skew-symmetric matrices are the skew-Hermitian matrices

Refinements
An intuitive way to understand an ε-quadratic form is to think of it as a quadratic refinement of its associated ε-symmetric form.

If 2 is invertible, this second relation follows from the first (as the quadratic form can be recovered from the associated bilinear form), but at 2 this additional refinement is necessary.

Examples
An easy example for an ε-quadratic form is the standard hyperbolic ε-quadratic form . (Here,  denotes the dual of the R-module R.) It is given by the bilinear form . The standard hyperbolic ε-quadratic form is needed for the definition of L-theory.

For the field of two elements  there is no difference between (+1)-quadratic and (−1)-quadratic forms, which are just called quadratic forms. The Arf invariant of a nonsingular quadratic form over F2 is an F2-valued invariant with important applications in both algebra and topology, and plays a role similar to that played by the discriminant of a quadratic form in characteristic not equal to two.

Manifolds 

The free part of the middle homology group (with integer coefficients) of an oriented even-dimensional manifold has an ε-symmetric form, via Poincaré duality, the intersection form. In the case of singly even dimension , this is skew-symmetric, while for doubly even dimension 4k, this is symmetric. Geometrically this corresponds to intersection, where two n/2-dimensional submanifolds in an n-dimensional manifold generically intersect in a 0-dimensional submanifold (a set of points), by adding codimension. For singly even dimension the order switches sign, while for doubly even dimension order does not change sign, hence the ε-symmetry. The simplest cases are for the product of spheres, where the product  and  respectively give the symmetric form  and skew-symmetric form  In dimension two, this yields a torus, and taking the connected sum of g tori yields the surface of genus g, whose middle homology has the standard hyperbolic form.

With additional structure, this ε-symmetric form can be refined to an ε-quadratic form. For doubly even dimension this is integer valued, while for singly even dimension this is only defined up to parity, and takes values in Z/2. For example, given a framed manifold, one can produce such a refinement. For singly even dimension, the Arf invariant of this skew-quadratic form is the Kervaire invariant.

Given an oriented surface Σ embedded in R3, the middle homology group H1(Σ) carries not only a skew-symmetric form (via intersection), but also a skew-quadratic form, which can be seen as a quadratic refinement, via self-linking. The skew-symmetric form is an invariant of the surface Σ, whereas the skew-quadratic form is an invariant of the embedding , e.g. for the Seifert surface of a knot. The Arf invariant of the skew-quadratic form is a framed cobordism invariant generating the first stable homotopy group .

(This form has Arf invariant 0, and thus this embedded torus has Kervaire invariant 0.)

Applications
A key application is in algebraic surgery theory, where even L-groups are defined as Witt groups of ε-quadratic forms, by C.T.C.Wall

References

Quadratic forms
Surgery theory